= Sabandus =

Town of ancient Lycia

Coordinates: 36°18′08″N 29°59′40″E

Sabandus or Sabandos was a town of ancient Lycia.

Its site is tentatively located near modern Muskar in Asiatic Turkey.
